Skai Jackson (born April 8, 2002) is an American actress who was included in Times list of Most Influential Teens in 2016. She is best known for portraying the role of Zuri Ross in the Disney Channel sitcom Jessie (2011–2015), which she subsequently reprised in its sequel Bunk'd (2015–2018).

Jackson began acting at the age of five, making her debut in the film Liberty Kid (2007). She has provided the voice of Glory Grant across the Marvel Rising series (2018–2019) and voiced Summer in the animated series DreamWorks Dragons: Rescue Riders (2019–2020). In 2019, Jackson released her debut novel, Reach for the Skai: How to Inspire, Empower, and Clapback. The following year, she was a semi-finalist on the 29th season of Dancing with the Stars in 2020.

Early and personal life

Jackson was born in the Staten Island borough of New York City. She is of Afro-Honduran and African-American descent. She began her career as a child model, appearing in numerous national commercials, including for Band-Aid, Coca-Cola, Pepsi, and Old Navy.

In March 2020, Jackson filed court papers for a restraining order against rapper Bhad Bhabie claiming that Bhabie had harassed her. The petition was temporarily granted, and later dropped by Jackson. On June 6, 2020, Jackson faced criticism after tweeting an image of fans doxing an alleged minor over the use of a racial slur on an Instagram post.

Acting career 

Jackson's first major acting role was in the independent film Liberty Kid (2007), which was followed by a guest appearance in an episode of Rescue Me (2008). In 2009, Jackson made a cameo in the film The Rebound, and in the same year was cast as a member of the Nickelodeon pre-school animated series Bubble Guppies, playing the role of Little Fish. She continued to make cameo and guest appearances in the television series Team Umizoomi, Royal Pains, and Boardwalk Empire, as well as the 2011 films Arthur and The Smurfs.

In 2011, she was cast as Zuri Ross in the Disney Channel sitcom Jessie, which aired from September 30, 2011, to October 16, 2015. For the role, Jackson received an Image Award nomination. In 2013, she appeared as Joetta Watson in the Hallmark Channel television film The Watsons Go To Birmingham and in the year following guest-starred in an episode of Disney XD's animated series Ultimate Spider-Man. In 2015, after Jessie ended, it was announced that Jackson would reprise her role as Zuri Ross in the Disney Channel series Bunk'd, a spin-off series. Bunk'd premiered on July 31, 2015, and she departed from the series after its third season in 2018.

In 2016, Jackson was included on Time's list of Most Influential Teens, and in 2017, she received a nomination from the Shorty Awards for Best Influencer. Following her success with Disney, Jackson promptly made a guest appearance in K.C. Undercover. In 2018, Jackson made a guest appearance in Marvel Rising: Initiation as Glory Grant, a role she reprised in Marvel Rising: Chasing Ghosts, and Marvel Rising: Battle of the Bands.

In 2019, Jackson was cast in the music video for Lil Nas X's "Panini". The video gained worldwide popularity, and spawned a variety of memes due to her character being unable to escape the rapper. Also in 2019, Jackson made her writing debut with the book Reach for the Skai: How to Inspire, Empower, and Clapback, and began voicing Summer on the Netflix animated series DreamWorks Dragons: Rescue Riders, which ended in 2020. On September 2, 2020, Jackson was announced as one of the celebrities competing on the 29th season of Dancing with the Stars, which premiered on September 14, 2020. Her partner was Alan Bersten. The pair made it the semi-finals but was eliminated 10th on November 16, 2020. In 2021, Jackson was a singing bust in Muppets Haunted Mansion.

Filmography

Film

Television

Music videos

Bibliography

Books 

 Reach for the Skai: How to Inspire, Empower, and Clapback (2019)

Awards and nominations

References

External links

2002 births
Living people
21st-century African-American women
21st-century American actresses
Actresses from New York City
African-American actresses
African-American child actresses
Afro-Honduran
American child actresses
American film actresses
American television actresses
People from Staten Island